Joseph H. Neal (August 31, 1950 – February 14, 2017) was an American politician. He was a member of the South Carolina House of Representatives from the 70th District, serving from 1993 until his death in 2017. He was a member of the Democratic party.

He died on February 14, 2017, at the age of 66.

References

1950 births
2017 deaths
People from Hopkins, South Carolina
Benedict College alumni
Colgate Rochester Crozer Divinity School alumni
Pittsburgh Theological Seminary alumni
Democratic Party members of the South Carolina House of Representatives
African-American state legislators in South Carolina
21st-century American politicians
20th-century American politicians
20th-century African-American politicians
21st-century African-American politicians